Robert Hewitson (26 February 1884 – 1957) was an English professional footballer who played for Morpeth Harriers, Barnsley, Crystal Palace, Oldham Athletic, Tottenham Hotspur, Croydon Common and Doncaster Rovers.

Football career 
Hewitson began his playing career at Morpeth Harriers before joining Barnsley in 1903, the goalkeeper played a total of 62 matches between 1903 and 1904. Hewitson moved on to Crystal Palace where he featured in 75 matches in all competitions. In 1907 he signed for Oldham Athletic before joining Tottenham Hotspur in 1908 and went on to participate in a further 34 matches in all competitions. After leaving White Hart Lane he played for Croydon Common and finally Doncaster Rovers.

References

External links 
Picture of Hewitson Retrieved 25 August 2014

1884 births
1957 deaths
People from Blyth, Northumberland
Footballers from Northumberland
English footballers
English Football League players
Association football goalkeepers
Morpeth Harriers F.C. players
Barnsley F.C. players
Crystal Palace F.C. players
Oldham Athletic A.F.C. players
Tottenham Hotspur F.C. players
Croydon Common F.C. players
Doncaster Rovers F.C. players